Christopher Lamprecht (born 22 April 1985) is a German former footballer who plays for VfR Kaiserslautern. He is a defender that can play right fullback as well as central defensive midfield.

Career
Born in Stendal, East Germany, Lamprecht started his career as a youth player for German Bundesliga team VfL Wolfsburg, where he played since the age of 14. After joining their reserves in 2004, he signed a professional contract in July 2005. After two and a half years in the first squad, the new coach, former Bayern Munich coach Felix Magath, decided to loan him to 1. FC Kaiserslautern. He was able to impress Milan Šašić, the coach of 1. FC Kaiserslautern, at the time, who consequentially offered him a contract. However, his positive relationship with the coaching staff depleted after several mishaps, and he was transferred to Kaiserslautern's reserve squad in the Regionalliga West.

In July 2009, he was sold to Holstein Kiel where he believed to have a better perspective. On 30 July 2010, he signed a contract with Kickers Offenbach.

References

External links
 

1985 births
Living people
German footballers
VfL Wolfsburg players
VfL Wolfsburg II players
1. FC Kaiserslautern players
Holstein Kiel players
Kickers Offenbach players
Bundesliga players
2. Bundesliga players
3. Liga players
Association football defenders
People from Stendal
Footballers from Saxony-Anhalt